Joan I or Joanna I may refer to:

 Joan I, Countess of Burgundy (1191–1205)
 Joan I of Navarre (1271–1305), daughter of King Henry I of Navarre and Blanche of Artois
 Joan I, Countess of Auvergne (1326–1360)
 Joanna I of Naples (1328–1382)
 Joan I, Countess of Dreux (1345 – 1346), only child of Peter, Count of Dreux
 Joanna of Castile (1479–1555), a.k.a. Joanna I or Juana I, Queen of Castile and Aragon, daughter of Isabella I of Castile and Ferdinand II of Aragon

See also
 Joan Ramon I, Count of Cardona (1375-1441), Catalan nobleman